Neoitamus cyanurus, the common awl robberfly,  is a species of 'robber fly' belonging to the family Asilidae.

Distribution
It is an eastern Palearctic realm species, with a limited distribution in Europe (Austria, Belgium, British Isles, Bulgaria, Czech Republic, Denmark, Finland, France, Germany, Greece, Hungary, Ireland, Italy, North European Russia, Poland, Romania, Slovakia, Sweden, Switzerland, The Netherlands), but it is also present in the Near East and in the Oriental realm.

Habitat
This species mainly inhabits spruce forest edge and hedge rows., but also wooded gardens and parks.

Description 
This rather large dark elongate species has strongly angled hair beneath the eyes, mouthparts with a piercing and sucking proboscis and a gray thorax. The abdomen is very narrow compared to the thorax. The first five segments of the abdomen are gray. Abdomen of the male is shining steel-blue on the sixth and seventh segments, while in the female those segments appear narrowed to form a part of the very long ovipositor. Male claspers are elongate oblong. The legs are very long, nearly all black, with short, thickened bristles, but the extreme base of tarsi is orange.

Biology
Adults can be found from May to October, peaking in June and July. It is an  ancient woodland species (especially oak). The adult insects perch on tree trunks, or branches  waiting for other flying insects, which they then capture with their long bristly legs. Their prey is often larger than the captor. The prey spectrum is broad including, for example, small butterflies, green lacewings (Pseudomallada ventralis), flies, gnats, cicadas, beetles and many more. The larvae develop in the soil and there feed on insect larvae.

Gallery

References

External links
 Photos at Fugleonatur
 Garden Safari

Asilidae
Insects described in 1849
Brachyceran flies of Europe
Taxa named by Hermann Loew